On 7 November 2019, 37-year old Jagmael Singh was mob lynched in Sangrur, Punjab, India. He was brutally beaten by four men and was forced to drink human urine. He died after 9 days of treatment in Chandigarh. He was a construction worker and was accused of a fight with one of the accused of the case, Rinku over the matter of sitting with them in a Panchayati of upper caste.

It was said that he was taken to the Rinku's house, where he was tied and brutally lynched and tortured by the four men. His death was a major issue and many Dalit groups protested on the matter of his killing and demanded severe most punishment for the accused.

Events 
Jagmael Singh was a lower caste Dalit construction worker from Sangrur district of Punjab. He was a poor man and lived in a family of six people in the village of Changiwala with his old mother, wife Manjit Kaur, two daughters and a son.

On 6 November 2019, Singh went to a village panchayat of upper-caste Sikhs in Sangrur chotal were he had a fight with Rinku. Some time later, Rinku, along with his three friends arrived and kidnapped Singh. They took him to the Rinku's house on 7 November and tied him after which they beat him brutally and was also tortured severely by the four. He was also forced to drink their urine, after that they pulled his thigh skin with pliers causing infection. Later the four went from there and left him to die. On the same date his friends and relatives searched and found him in very bad state and immediately took him to PGI Chandigarh where he was treated for 9 days, but to the infection in his thighs (due to pulling of his skin by pliers) he didn't survive.

Response 
The family of Jagmael demanded a strong enquiry to investigate the case and also stated that the all four accused moved freely and instead they were investigated by the police officials. But when the matter came into the media, the police started operating and investigating the case and a complaint was registered against the four on the account of IPC - 302 (Murder) and IPC - 353  (SC/ST Act). The family members also demanded the Capital punishment for the accused.

There were also a series of protests by the family members of the victim and many Dalit organizations regarding the matter and the DGP of Punjab Police also assured the family members to investigate the case as their priority.

Notes

References

External links 

 Talk of Punjab's Dalit man torture by The Lallantop.

2019 crimes in India
Kidnapping in India
November 2019 crimes in Asia
November 2019 events in India
2019 deaths
Lynching deaths in India
Riots and civil disorder in India
Sangrur district
Murder in India
Caste-related violence in India
Dalit history
Deaths by beating
Deaths by person in India
People murdered in Punjab, India
Sangrur